Courts of Illinois include:
State courts of Illinois

Supreme Court of Illinois
Illinois Appellate Court (5 districts)
Illinois Circuit Courts (24 judicial circuits)

Federal courts located in Illinois

United States Court of Appeals for the Seventh Circuit (headquartered in Chicago, having jurisdiction over the United States District Courts of Illinois, Indiana, and Wisconsin)
United States District Court for the Northern District of Illinois
United States District Court for the Central District of Illinois
United States District Court for the Southern District of Illinois

Former federal courts of Illinois

United States District Court for the District of Illinois (extinct, subdivided in 1855)
United States District Court for the Eastern District of Illinois (extinct, reorganized in 1978)

See also
 Judiciary of Illinois

References

External links
National Center for State Courts – directory of state court websites.

Courts in the United States
Courts
Courts